The 2011 Eneco Tour was the seventh running of the Eneco Tour cycling stage race. It started with an individual time trial in Amersfoort in the Netherlands on 8 August and finished on 14 August 2011 in Sittard-Geleen, also in the Netherlands.

The race consisted of seven stages, including the race-commencing prologue, as well as another individual time trial held in Roermond in the Netherlands. It was the 20th race of the 2011 UCI World Tour season. The race was held one week earlier than during the previous season and also one day less in length. Like the previous years, parts of the Netherlands and Belgium were covered.

The race was won by  rider Edvald Boasson Hagen, who claimed the leader's white jersey for the second time in three years – after his previous triumph in 2009 – after a strong finish on the individual time trial stage, and maintained his advantage to the end of the race, winning the race's final stage in Sittard-Geleen.

Team Sky had originally been classed as winners by a second, but a protest from Team RadioShack general manager Dirk Demol, overturned a one-second split in the field and Team RadioShack won the countback on time trial timings.

Schedule

Teams
The 18 teams from the UCI World Tour automatically take part in this edition of the Eneco Tour. 

Stages

Prologue
8 August 2011 – Amersfoort (Netherlands),  individual time trial (ITT)

Stage 1
9 August 2011 – Oosterhout (Netherlands) to Sint Willebrord (Netherlands),

Stage 2
10 August 2011 – Aalter (Belgium) to Ardooie (Belgium),

Stage 3
11 August 2011 – Heers (Belgium) to Andenne (Belgium),

Stage 4
12 August 2011 – Roermond (Netherlands),  individual time trial (ITT)

Stage 5
13 August 2011 – Genk (Belgium) to Genk (Belgium),

Stage 6
14 August 2011 – Sittard-Geleen (Netherlands) to Sittard-Geleen (Netherlands),

Final standings

General classification

Points classification

Young Riders' classification

Team classification

Classification leadership table

World rankings points
The Eneco Tour was one of 27 events throughout the season that contributed points towards the 2011 UCI World Tour. Points were awarded to the top 10 finishers overall, and to the top five finishers in each stage.  Only riders on UCI ProTour teams were eligible to receive rankings points.

References

External links
Race website

Eneco Tour
Benelux Tour
Eneco
Eneco